Jean Baptiste Charlet (born 31 January 1978) is a French snowboarder. He competed in the men's halfpipe event at the 1998 Winter Olympics.

References

1978 births
Living people
French male snowboarders
Olympic snowboarders of France
Snowboarders at the 1998 Winter Olympics
Sportspeople from Aveyron
20th-century French people